The Soap Opera Digest Award for Hottest Male Star has been given every year since the ninth Soap Opera Digest Award in 1993 until 1999.

In the lists below, the winner of the award for each year is shown first, followed by the other nominees.

Winners

Total awards won

Multiple wins

References

Soap Opera Digest Awards